Monique Mund-Dopchie (born in Ronse, Belgium, on 21 August 1943) is a Belgian classicist. She is the current president of the Royal Academy of Science, Letters and Fine Arts of Belgium.

In 1970 Mund-Dopchie obtained a doctorate in Classical Philology. She went on to work as a professor of Ancient Greek Literature and of the History of Humanism in the Philosophy Department of the Université Catholique de Louvain. In 2008 she became professor emeritus. After her retirement a Festschrift was presented to her jointly with Gilbert Tournoy: Syntagmatia: Essays on Neo-Latin Literature in Honour of Monique Mund-Dopchie and Gilbert Tournoy, edited by Dirk Sacré and Jan Papy (Leuven University Press, 2009)

In 2000 she was elected a corresponding member of the Royal Academy of Belgium, and in 2004 a full member. Since January 2017 she has been president of the Academy.

Honours 
 1965: fellow of the Belgian Historical Institute in Rome.
 1972: fellow of the British Council. 
 1974: fellow of the "Bourse Claire Préaux".
 2004: Member of the Royal Academy of Science, Letters and Fine Arts of Belgium, (Letters Class)
 2006: Grand Officer in the Order of the Crown.
 2017: President of the Royal Academy of Science, Letters and Fine Arts of Belgium

Publications 
 Le premier travail français sur Eschyle: le Prométhée enchaîné de Jean Dorat (Université catholique de Louvain, 1976)
 La survie d'Eschyle à la Renaissance: éditions, traductions, commentaires et imitations (Peeters, 1984)
 Les survivants de l’âge d’or. Les pays des confins dans l’imaginaire grec avec un aperçu de leur survie dans la culture occidentale (Louvain-la-Neuve, 2001) 
 Ultima Thulé: Histoire d'un lieu et genèse d'un mythe (Geneva, 2009), 
 L’Atlantide de Platon: Histoire vraie ou préfiguration de l’Utopie de Thomas More? (Académie royale de Belgique, 2017)

References

1943 births
President of the Royal Academy of Belgium
Grand Officers of the Order of the Crown (Belgium)
Living people